Forest Arthur Harness (June 24, 1895 – July 29, 1974) was an American lawyer, World War I veteran, and politician who served five terms as a U.S. Representative from Indiana from 1939 to 1949.

Biography
Born in Kokomo, Indiana, Harness attended public schools and graduated in 1917 from the law department of Georgetown University, Washington, D.C. where he was a member of the Delta Chi fraternity.

Military career 
He served overseas during World War I as a first lieutenant, Three Hundred and Nineteenth Infantry from 1917 to 1919, for which he was awarded the Purple Heart. He served as captain in the Infantry Reserve, United States Army from 1920 to 1949.

Legal career 
He was admitted to the District of Columbia bar in 1917, as well as to the Indiana bar in 1919, and commenced practice in Kokomo, Indiana. He was serving as prosecuting attorney of Howard County, Indiana from 1920 to 1924, and as special assistant to the Attorney General of the United States from 1931 to 1935, when he resigned to resume private practice.

Congress 
Harness was elected as a Republican to the Seventy-sixth and to the four succeeding Congresses (January 3, 1939 – January 3, 1949).

In September 1944, Harness claimed on the House floor that the Australian government warned Washington (prior to the attack on Pearl Harbor) that a Japanese aircraft carrier was bound for Hawaii and that this information was withheld from the commanders at Pearl Harbor. Rumors of this sort had been around for a while, but Harness's charges put them in the public record.

He served as chairman of the Select Committee on the Federal Communications Commission (Eightieth Congress). He was an unsuccessful candidate for reelection in 1948 to the Eighty-first Congress, at which point he resumed the practice of law.

Later career and death
He served as Sergeant at Arms of the United States Senate from January 3, 1953, to January 3, 1955. He retired in 1960 and resided in Sarasota, Florida, where he died. He is entombed in the mausoleum at Crown Point Cemetery, Kokomo, Indiana.

References

 Retrieved on 2008-01-24

1895 births
1974 deaths
Georgetown University Law Center alumni
Sergeants at Arms of the United States Senate
United States Army officers
United States Army personnel of World War I
People from Kokomo, Indiana
20th-century American politicians
Republican Party members of the United States House of Representatives from Indiana